Uncle Frans (Swedish: Farbror Frans) is a 1926 Swedish historical drama film directed by Sigurd Wallén and starring Ivan Hedqvist, Inga Tidblad and Richard Lund. It was shot at the Råsunda Studios in Stockholm and on location in Gilleleje in Denmark. The film's sets were designed by the art director Vilhelm Bryde.

Synopsis
In the 1880s, an older woman reflects on the events of her life, including her romantic affairs.

Cast
 Ivan Hedqvist as Uncle Frans
 Inga Tidblad as 	Kaja
 Richard Lund as 	Peter Dam
 Margita Alfvén as 	Margareta Solling
 Stina Berg as 	Housekeeper
 Knut Lambert as	Kaja's Father
 Gustaf Lövås as 	Skater
 Olof Wifstrand as 	Helle
 Lili Ziedner as Actress

References

Bibliography
 Gustafsson, Tommy. Masculinity in the Golden Age of Swedish Cinema: A Cultural Analysis of 1920s Films. McFarland, 2014.
 Qvist, Per Olov & von Bagh, Peter. Guide to the Cinema of Sweden and Finland. Greenwood Publishing Group, 2000.

External links

1926 films
1926 drama films
Swedish silent feature films
Swedish black-and-white films
Films directed by Sigurd Wallén
1920s Swedish-language films
Films based on Danish novels
Films set in the 1880s
Swedish historical drama films
1920s historical drama films
Films shot in Denmark
Silent historical drama films
1920s Swedish films